Bruce John Graham (December 1, 1925 – March 6, 2010) was a Peruvian-American architect. Graham built buildings all over the world and was deeply involved with evolving the Burnham Plan of Chicago. Among his most notable buildings are the Inland Steel Building, the Willis Tower (formerly the Sears Tower), and the John Hancock Center. 
He was also responsible for planning the  Broadgate and Canary Wharf developments in London.

Architectural historian Franz Schulze called him "the Burnham of his generation."  He was a 1993 Pew Fellow.

Life
Born on December 1, 1925, in La Cumbre, Valle del Cauca,  Colombia, Graham was the son of a Canadian-born father who was an international banker, and a Peruvian mother. His first language was Spanish.

He attended Colegio San Jose de Rio Piedras in Puerto Rico, and graduated in 1944. He studied at the University of Dayton, Ohio, and  Structural Engineering at the Case School of Applied Sciences in Cleveland, Ohio. He graduated from the University of Pennsylvania in 1948 with a degree in Architecture.  When he first came to Chicago, he worked for Holabird and Root and joined the Chicago office Skidmore, Owings and Merrill, the largest architectural firm in the United States in 1951.

Career
During his 40-year tenure at SOM, Bruce Graham designed notable buildings all over the world from his home in Chicago, to Guatemala, Hong Kong, London, Cairo, and many other cities. He designed the Willis Tower, tallest building in the world for nearly 36 years, the 100 story tall John Hancock Center, One Shell Plaza etc.

He was extremely involved with the University of Pennsylvania, especially the School of Fine Arts.  He believed that teachers of architecture should be currently involved in its practice.  He was committed to the study of architectural theory and started the SOM Foundation. He also taught an architectural studio at Harvard.  Graham was a great collector of art. He befriended Alexander Calder, Joan Miró, Chryssa and Chillida, among others.  He invited these artists to create public works of art for the city of Chicago. He believed that to create great work an architect should be informed by philosophy, history, music and literature.

Design philosophy
Graham had studied structural engineering at Case Western and brought that knowledge and respect of the structure of an edifice to all his buildings. The Hancock building in particular, uses structural design for esthetic expression. Graham later expressed this in Hotel Arts in Barcelona and many other buildings including his buildings in London at Broadgate. Bruce Graham firmly believed that architecture like dance and music were a combination of structure and beauty. He believed that these forms of art represented the highest achievements of culture. Like other forms of Art, Graham believed that architecture was a result and a reflection of the morals of the culture in which it was built.

England projects
Graham left a major influence on London, where he was responsible for designing the master plans for the massive Broadgate and Canary Wharf developments. He also designed nine buildings in London.

Graham said, "We design our buildings for the inhabitants and for those who see them from the street. We try to design buildings that are a part of London, not in an imitation of period styles but an invention."

Major works
1958 - Inland Steel Building, Chicago, Illinois, USA
1970 - John Hancock Center, Chicago, Illinois, USA
1973 - Sears Tower (renamed Willis Tower), Wacker Drive, Chicago, USA
1973 - First Wisconsin Plaza, Milwaukee, Wisconsin, USA
1982 - Broadgate, London, England
1988 - Canary Wharf, London, England
1992 - Hotel Arts, Barcelona, Spain

Death
Graham died March 6, 2010, at the age of 84 in Hobe Sound, Florida. The cause was complications of Alzheimer’s disease, said his son, George. Graham was buried at Graceland Cemetery next to Fazlur Rahman Khan.

On October 14, 2010, Chicago Alderman Brendan Reilly, 42nd Ward, dedicated the streets to the south and east sides of the John Hancock Center – one of Graham’s most iconic achievements – as Honorary Bruce J. Graham Way. It runs along Chestnut Street between Mies van der Rohe Street and Michigan Avenue and along Mies van der Rohe Street – named after famed architect, Ludwig Mies van der Rohe - between Chestnut and Delaware Streets.

See also
BMA Tower in Kansas City, Missouri
Srinivasa 'Hal' Iyengar

References

External links
 Architect of Willis Tower and John Hancock Center dies
 Memorial Tribute to Fazlur Rahman Khan by Bruce Graham in the South Asian American Digital Archive (SAADA)

1925 births
2010 deaths
20th-century American architects
20th-century Canadian architects
American people of Canadian descent
American people of Peruvian descent
Colombian architects
Colombian emigrants to the United States
Colombian people of Canadian descent
Colombian people of Peruvian descent
University of Dayton alumni
Case Western Reserve University alumni
University of Pennsylvania School of Design alumni
Harvard University faculty
People from Bogotá
People from Hobe Sound, Florida
Peruvian architects
Pew Fellows in the Arts
Skyscraper architects